Birpara College, established in 1986, is general degree college in Birpara. It is in Alipurduar district. It offers undergraduate courses in arts and commerce. It is affiliated to  University of North Bengal.

Departments

Arts and Commerce
Bengali
English
Hindi
Nepali
History
Sociology
Economics
Geography
Political Science
Education
Commerce

Accreditation
The college is recognized by the University Grants Commission (UGC).

See also

References

External links
Birpara College
University of North Bengal
University Grants Commission
National Assessment and Accreditation Council

Colleges affiliated to University of North Bengal
Educational institutions established in 1986
Universities and colleges in Alipurduar district
1986 establishments in West Bengal